Orestis Paliaroutas (born August 6, 1994) is a Greek professional footballer who used to play as a left winger for AEK.He works as an orthopaedic surgeon in KAT hospital, Athens.He is married to Nikoleta Stanitsa since 5/7/2022.

Honours
AEK
Football League 2: 1
 2014(6th Group)

External links
 Αυτή είναι η νέα ΑΕΚ
 http://www.kifisiafc.gr/team/
 ΠΑΛΗΑΡΟΥΤΑΣ ΟΡΕΣΤΗΣ

1994 births
Living people
AEK Athens F.C. players
Association football midfielders
A.E. Kifisia F.C. players
Footballers from Athens
Greek footballers